The Ambassador Theatre Group (ATG) is a major international theatre organisation headquartered in the United Kingdom, with offices in Woking (head office), London, New York, Sydney, Mannheim and Cologne. ATG's key operations comprise three inter-related activities: theatre ownership and management, ticketing and marketing operations, and show productions

ATG runs more than 50 venues in Britain, the US and Germany. The company is among the most prolific theatre producers in the world with co-productions in the UK, New York, across North America, Europe, Asia and Australia. It is considered a market leader in theatre ticketing services through ATG Tickets, LOVEtheatre and Group Line.

The company was founded and run by the husband-and-wife team of Sir Howard Panter and Dame Rosemary Squire OBE, who topped The Stage 100 list of prominent UK theatre personalities from 2010 to 2016.

Business model
ATG's business model involves the combination of theatre ownership with production management, marketing and ticket operations. ATG manages (and in some cases own) venues, mainly theatres, which host shows for paying audiences, including shows created by its production functions; ATG's production functions create shows, which are hired out for performance at theatres including theatres managed by ATG; and ATG's ticketing and marketing function sells and charges fees for selling tickets, for venues, including venues owned by ATG.

Theatre ownership and management
ATG manages more than 50 theatres and one cinema in the UK, the US, and Germany. ATG's portfolio of 10 West End theatres include the Ambassadors, Apollo Victoria, Duke of York's, Fortune, Harold Pinter, Lyceum, Phoenix, Piccadilly, Playhouse, and Savoy. ATG also has UK regional theatres in Aylesbury, Birmingham, Brighton, Bristol, Edinburgh, Folkestone, Glasgow, Liverpool, Manchester, Milton Keynes, Oxford, Richmond, Stoke-on-Trent, Stockton on Tees, Torquay, Wimbledon, Woking and York.

In the US, ATG controls two Broadway theatres, the Lyric Theatre, and the Hudson Theatre, the latter leased from a subsidiary of Millennium & Copthorne Hotels. In 2015, ATG acquired ACE Theatrical Group, giving ATG control of the King's Theatre in Brooklyn, New York; the Saenger Theatre in New Orleans, Louisiana; the Mahalia Jackson Theater of the Performing Arts in New Orleans, Louisiana; the Majestic Theatre in San Antonio, Texas; and the Charline McCombs Empire Theatre in San Antonio, Texas.

Also in 2015, ATG became leaseholder and took over the management of the Theatre Royal, Sydney's oldest theatrical institution, one of the city's premier venues and ATG's first theatre in the Asia-Pacific region, though the New South Wales government closed the venue in 2016.

ATG is the majority shareholder of BB Group, one of the leading producers and promoters of premium live entertainment in Europe, with a particular strength in touring musicals and dance productions throughout Germany, Austria and Switzerland. BB Group productions include West Side Story, We Will Rock You, The Rocky Horror Show, Cats, Alvin Ailey American Dance Theater and Ballet Revolución, The Lion King and The Bodyguard. BB Group has won the tender to re-develop the Staatenhaus in Cologne as a 1700-seat theatre.

Theatre producing activity 
ATG has its own producing arm, ATG Productions. ATG 's production activities expanded with the launch of Theatre Royal Brighton Productions and the formation of producing partnerships with directors Jerry Mitchell and Jamie Lloyd in 2011 and 2012. ATG has a number of major production company initiatives and partnerships including Jerry Mitchell Productions, Theatre Royal Brighton Productions and Jaime Lloyd Productions.

ATG has a group partner company, Sonia Friedman Productions (SFP), a West End and Broadway production company responsible for major theatre productions in London and on Broadway in recent years. Recent SFP West End and Broadway theatre productions and co-productions include the UK premiere of The Book of Mormon, Jez Butterworth's The River on Broadway, starring Hugh Jackman; The Nether, Bend It Like Beckham: the Musical, Hamlet, starring Benedict Cumberbatch; Electra, King Charles III, Sunny Afternoon, Shakespeare in Love, Jerusalem, Ghosts, Mojo, Chimerica, Twelfth Night, Richard III and Old Times. Friedman also collaborated with J. K. Rowling on the 2016 stage play based on the Harry Potter stories, Harry Potter and the Cursed Child, in co-production with Colin Callender.

Current and recent ATG co-productions
Current and recent ATG co-productions include The End of Longing, starring Matthew Perry; The Maids, starring Uzo Aduba, Zawe Ashton and Laura Carmichael; The Homecoming, starring John Simm, Gary Kemp and Keith Allen; The Ruling Class, starring James McAvoy; Oresteia,  Women on the Verge of a Nervous Breakdown, starring Tamsin Greig; East is East, starring Jane Horrocks; Richard III, starring Martin Freeman; Dirty Rotten Scoundrels, starring Robert Lindsay; Jersey Boys, Priscilla Queen of the Desert, starring Jason Donovan / Duncan James; Inala, Love Me Tender, Macbeth, starring James McAvoy; The Hothouse, starring Simon Russell Beale and John Simm; Passion Play, starring Zöe Wanamaker; Posh, Jumpyand Constellations (Royal Court at the Duke of York's); Dolly Patron's 9 to 5 – the Musical, Legally Blonde – the Musical, Monty Python's Spamalot, The Rocky Horror Show, Goodnight Mister Tom, The Mystery of Charles Dickens, starring Simon Callow, South Pacific, starring Samantha Womack and Paulo Szot; All New People, starring Zach Braff; Ghost – the Musical , Matthew Bourne's Nutcracker!, Being Shakespeare, starring Simon Callow; The Misanthrope, starring Damian Lewis and Keira Knightley; West Side Story, Elling, starring John Simm; and Guys and Dolls, starring Ewan McGregor.

Older productions
ATG's earlier productions include the co-production of The Weir in London and on Broadway (winner of the 1999 Olivier Award for Best New Play); Smokey Joe's Cafe in the West End; the Olivier award-winning Slava's Snowshow in the West End and North America; and the multi award-winning West End musical Carmen Jones.

Broadway productions
Recent ATG productions on Broadway include The Mountaintop, starring Samuel L Jackson and Angela Bassett; Exit the King, starring Geoffrey Rush and Susan Sarandon; and John Doyle's award-winning production of Stephen Sondheim's Sweeney Todd: the Demon Barber Fleet Street. ATG also co-produced Constellations on Broadway and currently co-producing multi-Tony Award-winning The King and I with Lincoln Center Theater.

Productions in Australia
ATG's productions in Australia include Ghost the Musical, Legally Blonde – the Musical, Thriller Live, The Rocky Horror Show, Guys and Dolls and West Side Story.

Ticketing and marketing operations
ATG runs ATG Tickets, which provides the in-house ticketing services to ATG's UK theatre's and manages ATG's Theatre Card membership programme and ticketing promotional partnerships. The ticketing website atgtickets.com was launched in 2008 and has since been recognised by Hitwise as the UK's number one theatre ticketing website, with 20 million unique visits per annum.

In 2011, ATG Theatre Card, the UK's largest paid-for theatre membership scheme was launched. ATG's pioneering marketing activities were also recognised by the industry, winning the Hollis Silver Medal Sponsorship Award in 2010 and Media Week's National Media Collaboration of the Year Award in 2012. Ticket Machine Group, a long established ticket agency, was acquired by ATG in 2013 and provides customers with a choice of shows in the West End as well as supporting ticket sales in ATG theatres, through its key brands LOVEtheatre.com and Group Line.

ATG is currently rolling out an Access Membership scheme. It is the only free membership scheme that allows customers to book tickets online, including wheelchair positions and the best-accessible seats. The scheme has been carefully designed in partnership with ATG Customer Focus Groups, an Access Consultant and Disability Organisations. The ATG Access Membership Scheme will be trialled during 2018 before becoming live in 2019 in all UK ATG venues.

LOVEtheatre.com and Group Line 
In 2013, in order to increase the variety and scope of its operation, ATG acquired the Ticket Machine Group with its key brands, Group Line and LOVEtheatre.com, both of whom continue to be major ticket agencies in their own right in London.

Group Line is the leading group sales agency in London offering group bookers access to all ATG venues as well as most shows across the West End. Group Line has been nominated for and won multiple industry awards, including Best Ticketing Agency, Best Group Ticketing Agency and Ticket Supplier of the Year.

LOVEtheatre.com is one of the most recognised and trusted names for West End ticket sales. They offer tickets for all ATG London venues as well as providing ticket sales to the widest variety of theatres and attractions in the Capital.

History

Beginnings

Squire and Panter had known each other since 1979, and Panter offered Squire a job after she was made redundant in 1986. The company now known as ATG began through Panter meeting property developer brothers Peter and John Beckwith. The Beckwiths' company, London and Edinburgh Trust, was working on a development in Woking, Surrey, that was to include an arts and entertainment complex, and the Beckwiths asked Panter and Squire to plan and manage it. When London and Edinburgh Trust was sold before the Woking development was completed in 1992, a structure was set up that allowed Panter and Squire to continue to run the theatre. Around that time the ATG company was established, with founding investors including Eddie Kulukundis.

In February 1992 ATG bought the Duke of York's Theatre from Capital Radio, with significant support from Kulukundis. In 1995, ATG bought its second London theatre, the Ambassadors. The company also bid successfully for contracts to manage new theatres being launched in Milton Keynes and Stoke-on-Trent.

ACT deal
ATG underwent major expansion in 2000 through the acquisition of seven West End theatres from Associated Capital Theatres (ACT): the Albery (now named the Noël Coward), the Comedy (now named the Harold Pinter), Donmar Warehouse, Phoenix, Piccadilly, Whitehall (now Trafalgar Studios) and Wyndham's theatres. Expansion required the involvement of larger corporate investors including AREA Property Partners and Carlton Television.

Subsequent deals included taking on the running of theatres in Bromley, Richmond and Glasgow.

Live Nation deal
In November 2009, ATG consolidated its position as the major UK theatre owner by purchasing the Live Nation UK theatre portfolio of 16 venues in England and Scotland in a £90 million acquisition. Live Nation sold the theatres as part of a business decision of "selling off assets that are not core to our live music strategy". At that time Exponent Private Equity became the new majority owner of ATG by financing the theatre takeover. Exponent provided at least £75m of financing for the deal, which valued ATG at £150m. Coinciding with the expansion, former BBC director general Greg Dyke joined ATG in a new role of executive chairman.

Potential competition concerns led to an investigation by the UK Office of Fair Trading (OFT). Its conclusion was that "the OFT does not believe that it is or may be the case that the merger has resulted or may be expected to result in a substantial lessening of competition within a market or markets in the United Kingdom" and "[t]his merger will therefore not be referred to the Competition Commission".

Expansion outside the UK
In 2012, ATG indicated an intention to expand into international theatre ownership, possibly in Australia and China. This included the appointment of Tim McFarlane as CEO for ATG Asia/Pacific. In November 2012 it was announced ATG would be establishing a regional headquarters in Sydney.

ATG's acquisition of Broadway's Foxwoods Theatre in May 2013 heralded the company's US debut, with Panter commenting, "Ownership of The Foxwoods Theatre within the group will provide a catalyst to expand in the North American market." (In March 2014, ATG renamed the venue the Lyric Theatre, following the end of the naming sponsorship deal.)

Later in 2013, global private equity firm buyout firm Providence Equity Partners purchased became a majority shareholder in ATG from Exponent. Exponent retains a minority stake in ATG as part of the deal and continues to work with Providence and the existing management team including Joint CEO's and co-founders Sir Howard Panter and Rosemary Squire OBE. Greg Dyke continues in his role as ATG chairman.

In August 2015, ATG became leaseholder and took over the management of the Theatre Royal, Sydney's oldest theatrical institution – marking ATG's first theatre in Asia Pacific. In September of the same year, ATG acquired ACE Theatrical Group. ACE operates the King's Theatre in Brooklyn, New York; the Saenger Theatre in New Orleans, Louisiana; the Mahalia Jackson Theater for the Performing Arts in New Orleans, Louisiana; the Majestic Theatre in San Antonio, Texas; and the Charline McCombs Empire Theatre in San Antonio, Texas. In December 2015, ATG announced that through its subsidiary, Hudson Theatre LLC, ATG entered a long-term lease for the Hudson Theatre, its second theatre on Broadway, from a subsidiary of Millennium & Copthorne Hotels plc group of companies (M&C).

In February 2023, it was announced that ATG would merge with Jujamcyn.

Culture
Panter has on several occasions described ATG as a company "of national stature but with local sensitivity".

ATG has demonstrated a commitment to the (often historic) buildings that it manages. In 2009, the Theatres Trust, the National Advisory Public Body for theatres in the UK, stated that it "works regularly with ATG, advising them on their plans for maintenance and care of their theatres. As well as having a good record of looking after its theatres, the company has also been a leader in promoting environmental best practice and reducing their theatres' carbon emissions." ATG also uses a "restoration levy" on tickets to raise funds to upgrade the theatres that they manage.

ATG have won awards for staff training including the 2005 Excellence in Workforce Development Award from the Learning and Skills Council.

The company has displayed commitment to innovation, with examples including the pioneering of ergonomically improved seats, adapted theatre performances for children with autism disorders, and the 'ATG Theatre Card' loyalty program.

Ownership
ATG is controlled by Providence Equity Partners. Exponent Private Equity has a minority stake. Peter Beckwith, through his company PMB Holdings, is a "major shareholder". Theatre impresario and shipping broker Eddie Kulukundis was a shareholder. Panter and Squire own 8% of ATG, with an option on a further 5%, according to reports in 2003.

List of venues managed by ATG

Theatres
Start year indicates the year of ATG's first involvement, End year indicates the last year of ATG involvement (where applicable).

In terms of ownership, it is often unclear whether ATG own the freehold to a theatre or a leasehold: reports use terms such as buy, purchase and own, but rarely specify whether they are referring to the freehold or to a leasehold.

Cinema
ATG also operate the six-screen Nova Cinema, Woking, in the same complex that contains the New Victoria and Rhoda McGaw theatres.

References

West End theatre
Theatre in London
British theatre managers and producers
Companies based in the City of Westminster